is a former Japanese football player.

He moved to Kamatamare Sanuki on a loan deal in May 2010. He announced his retirement from the game in December 2010.

Club statistics

References

External links

1988 births
Living people
Association football people from Tokushima Prefecture
Japanese footballers
J2 League players
Tokushima Vortis players
Kamatamare Sanuki players
Association football forwards